López Nunatak is a steep-sided granitic nunatak,  high, forming the northern extremity of the Breznik Heights, Greenwich Island in the South Shetland Islands, Antarctica  and overlooking Fuerza Aérea Glacier to the south-southwest, and Ash Point and the Chilean Captain Arturo Prat Base to the northwest.

The feature was charted by the 1947 Chilean Antarctic Expedition and subsequently named after First Lieutenant Sergio López Angulo, Communications Officer in the expedition frigate Iquique.

Location

Maps
 L.L. Ivanov et al. Antarctica: Livingston Island and Greenwich Island, South Shetland Islands. Scale 1:100000 topographic map. Sofia: Antarctic Place-names Commission of Bulgaria, 2005.
 L.L. Ivanov. Antarctica: Livingston Island and Greenwich, Robert, Snow and Smith Islands. Scale 1:120000 topographic map.  Troyan: Manfred Wörner Foundation, 2009.

References

 Composite Antarctic Gazetteer.

Nunataks of Greenwich Island
Nunataks of Antarctica